Brimus is a genus of longhorn beetles of the subfamily Lamiinae, containing the following species:

 Brimus affinis Breuning, 1971
 Brimus randalli Distant, 1898
 Brimus spinipennis (Pascoe, 1858)

References

Phrissomini
Cerambycidae genera